Kodur-e Pain (also Romanized as Kodūr-e Pā’īn) is a village in Azizabad Rural District, in the Central District of Narmashir County, Kerman Province, Iran. At the 2006 census, its population was 165, in 30 families.

References 

Populated places in Narmashir County